French Week was a weekly newspaper in English published in France.

History and profile
French Week was founded in 2010.  The newspaper's editor was Miranda Neame, former editor of French News. The news editor was Robert Harneis. The paper went into liquidation after publishing its 23rd weekly edition (7-13 January 2011).

Suggestions

External links
 Official website 

2010 establishments in France
2011 disestablishments in France
Defunct newspapers published in France
Defunct weekly newspapers
English-language newspapers published in France
Newspapers established in 2010
Publications disestablished in 2011
Weekly newspapers published in France